In elementary plane geometry, the power of a point is a real number that reflects the relative distance of a given point from a given circle. It was introduced by Jakob Steiner in 1826.

Specifically, the power  of a point   with respect to a circle  with center   and radius  is defined by
 
If  is outside the circle, then ,
if  is on the circle, then  and 
if  is inside the circle, then .

Due to the Pythagorean theorem the number  has the simple geometric meanings shown in the diagram: For a point  outside the circle  is the squared tangential distance  of point  to the circle .

Steiner used the power of a point for proofs of several statements on circles, for example:
 Determination of a circle, that intersects four circles by the same angle.
 Solving the Problem of Apollonius
 Construction of the Malfatti circles: For a given triangle determine three circles, which touch each other and two sides of the triangle each.
 Spherical version of Malfatti's problem: The triangle is a spherical one.

Essential tools for investigations on circles are the radical axis of two circles and the radical center of three circles.

The power diagram of a set of circles divides the plane into regions within which the circle minimizing the power is constant.

More generally, French mathematician  Edmond Laguerre defined the power of a point with respect to any algebraic curve in a similar way.

Geometric properties 
Besides the properties mentioned in the lead there are further properties:

Orthogonal circle 

Hence the circle  with center  through  passes , too, and intersects  orthogonal:
 The circle with center  and radius  intersects circle  orthogonal.

 
If the angle  is given, then one gets the radius  by solving the quadratic equation
.

Intersecting secants theorem, intersecting chords theorem 

For the intersecting secants theorem and chord theorem the power of a point plays the role of an invariant:

 Intersecting secants theorem: For a point  outside a circle  and the intersection points  of a secant line  with  the following statement is true: , hence the product is independent of line . If  is tangent then  and the statement is the tangent-secant theorem.
 Intersecting chords theorem: For a point  inside a circle  and the intersection points  of a secant line  with  the following statement is true: , hence the product is independent of line .

Radical axis 
Let  be a point and  two non concentric circles with 
centers  and radii . Point  has the power  with respect to circle . It contains possible common points of the circles and is perpendicular to line .

Secants theorem, chords theorem: common proof 

Both theorems, including the tangent-secant theorem, can be proven uniformly:

Let  be a point,  a circle with the origin as its center and  an arbitrary unit vector. The parameters   of possible common points of line   (through ) and circle  can be determined by inserting the parametric equation into the circle's equation:

From Vieta's theorem one finds:
. (independent of  !)

Because of  one gets the following statement for the points :
, if  is outside the circle,
, if  is inside the circle ( have different signs !).

In case of  line  is a tangent  and  the square of the tangential distance of point  to circle .

Similarity points, common power of two circles

Similarity points 
Similarity points are an essential tool for Steiner's investigations on circles.

Given two circles

In the other case . In any case:
.
Inserting  and solving for  yields:
.

In case of  one gets .
In case of  the circles touch each other at point  inside (both circles on the same side of the common tangent line).
In case of  the circles touch each other at point  outside (both circles on different sides of the common tangent line).

Further more:
 If one circle is contained within the other, the points  lie  within both circles.

Monge's theorem states: The outer similarity points of three disjoint circles lie on a line.

Common power of two circles 

Let  be two circles,  their outer similarity point and  a line through , which meets the two circles at four points . From the defining property of point  one gets 

and from the secant theorem (see above) the two equations 

Combining these three equations yields:

Hence:  (independent of line  !).
The analog statement for the inner similarity point  is true, too.

The invariants  are called by Steiner common power of the two circles (gemeinschaftliche Potenz der beiden Kreise bezüglich ihrer Ähnlichkeitspunkte).

Determination of a circle that is tangent to two circles 

For a second secant through  :

From the secant theorem one gets:
The four points  lie on a circle.
And analogously:
 The four points  lie on a circle, too.
Because the radical lines of three circles meet at the radical (see: article radical line), one gets:
The secants  meet on the radical axis of the given two circles. 

Moving the lower secant (see diagram) towards the upper one, the red circle becomes a circle, that is tangent to both given circles. The center of the tangent circle is the intercept of the lines . The secants  become tangents at the points . The tangents intercept at the radical line  (in the diagram yellow).

Similar considerations generate the second tangent circle, that meets the given circles at the points  (see diagram).

All tangent circles to the given circles can be found by varying line .

Positions of the centers

If  is the center and  the radius of the circle, that is tangent to the given circles at the points , then:

Hence: the centers lie on a hyperbola with
foci , 
distance of the vertices , 
linear eccentricity  and 
.  

Considerations on the outside tangent circles lead to the analog result: 

If  is the center and  the radius of the circle, that is tangent to the given circles at the points , then:

The centers lie on the same hyperbola, but on the right branch.

See also Problem of Apollonius.

Power with respect to a sphere 
The idea of the power of a point with respect to a circle can be extended to a sphere
. The secants and chords theorems are true for a sphere, too, and can be proven literally as in the circle case.

Darboux product
The power of a point is a special case of the Darboux product between two circles, which is given by

where A1 and A2 are the centers of the two circles and r1 and r2 are their radii. The power of a point arises in the special case that one of the radii is zero.

If the two circles are orthogonal, the Darboux product vanishes.

If the two circles intersect, then their Darboux product is

where φ is the angle of intersection (see section orthogonal circle).

Laguerre's theorem
Laguerre defined the power of a point P with respect to an algebraic curve of degree n to be the product of the distances from the point to the intersections of a circle through the point with the curve, divided by the nth power of the diameter d. Laguerre showed that this number is independent of the diameter . In the case when the algebraic curve is a circle this is not quite the same as the power of a point with respect to a circle defined in the rest of this article, but differs from it by a factor of d2.

References

 .
 .

Further reading

External links

 Jacob Steiner and the Power of a Point at Convergence
 
 Intersecting Chords Theorem at cut-the-knot
 Intersecting Chords Theorem With interactive animation
 Intersecting Secants Theorem With interactive animation

Euclidean plane geometry
Analytic geometry